Dungonab Bay or Dongonab Bay ( Ḫalīj Dūnjūnāb) is a body of water on the coastline of Sudan on the Red Sea.

Geography
The Dungonab Bay is south-facing and is located 130 km to the north of Port Sudan. Its mid part, the Rawayah Lagoon, is surrounded by coral reefs. Together with Mukkawar Island and Sanganeb (an isolated coral reef), the area was declared the Dungonab Bay – Mukkawar Island Marine National Park and became a World Heritage Site in 2016. It has been designated as a protected Ramsar site since 2009.

See also
African Parks Network
List of World Heritage Sites in Africa
List of World Heritage Sites in the Arab States

References

External links
 Sanganeb Marine National Park and Dungonab Bay - Mukkawar Island Marine National Park UNESCO collection on Google Arts and Culture

Bays of the Red Sea
Bodies of water of Sudan
Ramsar sites in Sudan
Bays of Africa